Neural proliferation differentiation and control protein 1 is a protein that in humans is encoded by the NPDC1 gene.

Interactions 

NPDC1 has been shown to interact with E2F1.

References

Further reading